Father and Son is a 1934 British crime film directed by Monty Banks and starring Edmund Gwenn, Esmond Knight and James Finlayson. It was made at Teddington Studios as a quota quickie.

Cast
 Edmund Gwenn as John Bolton  
 Esmond Knight as Michael Bolton  
 James Finlayson as Bildad 
 Roland Culver as Vincent  
 Charles Carson as Colin Bolton  
 Daphne Courtney as Emily Yates  
 O. B. Clarence as Tom Yates 
 Margaret Yarde as Victoria

References

Bibliography
 Low, Rachael. Filmmaking in 1930s Britain. George Allen & Unwin, 1985.
 Wood, Linda. British Films, 1927-1939. British Film Institute, 1986.

External links

1934 films
British crime films
1934 crime films
1930s English-language films
Films shot at Teddington Studios
Films directed by Monty Banks
Quota quickies
Warner Bros. films
British black-and-white films
1930s British films